The Hohe Aderl is a  high mountain peak of the Venediger Group in East Tyrol.

Location

The Hohes Aderl is the fourth highest mountain in the Venediger Group.
It drains via the Isel and Drava into the Danube.

The Hohe Aderl is located in the center of the Venediger Group in the crest of the Hohen Gletscherdachs (High Glacier Roof) just south of the border between the federal state of Salzburg and East Tyrol, in the north of Prägraten am Großvenediger municipality. 

To the south, the southern ridge of the Großvenediger continues to the Hohe Ader (3225 m above sea level), which ends in the Schwarzer Ader (2988 m above sea level). 
In the east is the Rainertörl (3406 m above sea level), where the Schlatenkees in the north meets the Inner Mullwitzkees in the south. 
The Rainertörl separates the Hohe Aderl from the Rainerhorn (3559 m above sea level).
In the west there is another glacier, the Dorferkees. 
The closest refuges are the Neue Prager Hütte in the northeast, the Kürsingerhütte in the northwest, the Badener Hütte in the southwest and Defreggerhaus and Eisseehütte in the south.

Climbing

The Hohes Aderl was first climbed in 1854 by H. v. Acken with assistants. 
The first winter ascent was achieved by R. Spannagel with J. Unterwurzacher and J. Ensmann on 27 May 1892.

The normal route to the Hohe Aderl starts in the Rainertörl, which can be reached, for example, via the Großvenediger south ascent from the Defreggerhaus via the Innere Mullwitzkees. 
The ascent from Rainertörl takes place on a moderately inclined snow slope to the summit (not difficult). 
An alternative is to climb the southwest ridge from the Aderschartl.

Notes

Sources

Mountains of Tyrol (state)